Buddhism in Pakistan took root in the third century BCE under the Mauryan king Ashoka.

In 2012, the National Database and Registration Authority (NADRA) of Pakistan indicated that the contemporary Buddhist population of Pakistan was minuscule, with 1,492 adult holders of national identity cards (CNICs). The total population of Buddhists is therefore unlikely to be more than a few thousand. In 2017, the number of Buddhist voters was stated to be 1,884, and they were mostly concentrated in Sindh and Punjab.

The only functional Buddhist temple in Pakistan is in the Diplomatic Enclave at Islamabad, used by Buddhist diplomats from countries like Sri Lanka.

History 

Buddhists have been in Pakistan for at least 2,000 years. Archaeologists uncovered a Buddhist Temple in the Swat Valley built some time between 563 and 483 BCE. Mahayana Buddhism, one of the most prominent branches of Buddhism today, originated in Pakistan, although its total number of confirmed Buddhists is a fraction of what it was. In the Gandhara region, now part of modern Pakistan, Buddhist art and sculptures flourished.

Archaelogical sites

Khyber Pakhtunkhwa 
Gandhāra is the name of an ancient region centered around the Peshawar Valley and Swat river valley, though the cultural influence of "Greater Gandhara" extended across the Indus river to the Taxila region in Potohar Plateau and westwards into the Kabul Valley in Afghanistan, and northwards up to the Karakoram range.

Famed for its unique Gandharan style of art which is heavily influenced by the classical Greek and Hellenistic styles, Gandhara attained its height from the 1st century to the 5th century CE under the Kushan Empire, who had their capital at Peshawar (Puruṣapura). Gandhara "flourished at the crossroads of India, Central Asia, and the Middle East," connecting trade routes and absorbing cultural influences from diverse civilizations; Buddhism thrived until the 8th or 9th centuries, when Islam first began to gain sway in the region. It was also the centre of Vedic and later forms of Hinduism.

The monastic complex called Takht-i-Bahi is located 80 kilometers from Peshawar and 16 kilometers Northwest of the city of Mardan, Takht-i-Bahi was unearthed in early 20th century, and in 1980, it was included in the UNESCO World Heritage list as the largest Buddhist remains in Gandhara, along with the Sahr-i-Bahlol urban remains that date back to the same period, located about a kilometer south.

Oddiyana was a small region in present-day Swat District. It is ascribed importance in the development and dissemination of Vajrayāna Buddhism. It was also called as “the paradise of the Ḍākinīs”. Padmasambhava, the eighth-century Buddhist master who was instrumental in the introduction of Buddhism to Tibet, was believed to have been born in Oddiyana.

Founder of the Dzogchen tradition of Buddhism Garab Dorje was also born here.

Punjab 
Buddhism was practiced in the Punjab region, which is home to many Buddhist monasteries and stupa sites in the Taxila World Heritage Site locale. Some of the most important Buddhist figures hailing from Punjab are the chief female disciple of Buddha Khema, Bhadda Kapilani, Anoja and the founder of Sautrantika school of Buddhism Kumaralata.
Most of the archaeological sites of Taxila (600 BC to 500 AD) are located around Taxila Museum. For over 1,000 years, Taxila remained famous as a center of learning Gandharan art of sculpture, architecture, education and Buddhism in the days of Buddhist glory. There are over 50 archaeological sites scattered in a radius of 30 km around Taxila. Some of the most important sites are the Dhamarajika Stupa and Monastery (300 BC – 200 AD), Bhir Mound (600–200 BC), Sirkap (200 BC – 600 AD), Jandial Temple (c.250 BC) and Jaulian Monastery (200 – 600 AD).
A museum comprising various sections with rich archaeological finds of Taxila, arranged in chronological order and properly labeled, has been established close to the site.

Sindh 

Buddhist sites in Sindh are numerous but ill preserved in various stages of deterioration. Sites at Brahmanabad (Mansura Sanghar district) include a Buddhist stupa at Mohenjo-daro; Sirah-ji-takri near Rohri, Sukkur; Kahu-Jo-Daro at Mirpur Khas, Nawabshah; Sudheran-Jo-Thul near Hyderabad; Thul Mir Rukan stupa; Thul Hairo Khan Stupa; Bhaleel-Shah-Thul square stupas (5th–7th century A.D) at Dadu, and Kot-Bambhan-Thul buddhist tower near Tando Muhammad Khan. Many terracotta tiles from Kaho-Jo-Daro and Buddha statues are exhibited in Chatrapati Shivaji Museum, Mumbai.

Balochistan 
Chinese Buddhist traveller Hiuen Tsang reported many Buddhist temples in coastal regions of Makran, Balochistan. The remains of Buddhist cave city called Godrani caves can still be seen today.

Abū Rayḥān Muḥammad ibn Aḥmad Al-Bīrūnī states in his book Alberuni's India that the coast of India begins with Tiz, the capital of Makran.

According to historian Andre Wink:

Wink has recorded Hiuen Tsang's notings on the language and script in use in easternmost Makran (eastern parts of Pakistani Balochistan and Sindh):

Gilgit Baltistan 

The region has a number of surviving Buddhist archaeological sites, including the Manthal Buddha Rock—a rock relief of the Buddha at the edge of the village (near Skardu)—and the Sacred Rock of Hunza. Nearby are former sites of Buddhist shelters.

Baltistan was Buddhist majority until the arrival of Islam in this region in the 15th century. As most of the people converted to Islam, the presence of Buddhism in this region has now been limited to archeological sites, with the remaining Buddhists moving east to Ladakh, where Buddhism is the majority religion.

Demographics
The presence of Pakistani Buddhists in modern Pakistan is unclear, although a few Pakistanis have reported themselves as Buddhist. A report mentions that they are only found in the Azad Kashmir region. The Nurbakhshi sect is said to retain some elements of Buddhism.

According to the National Database and Registration Authority (NADRA), there were 1,492 buddhists in holding national identity cards (CNICs) in 2012. In 2017, it increased to 1,884 holders. They are mostly concentrated in Sindh and Punjab regions. According to a report, most of the Baori Buddhists do not have CNIC cards, and the actual Buddhist population could exceed 16,000.

In Punjab, Buddhists live primarily in the outskirts of the Mandi Yazman and Rahimyar Khan of Rohi region. Today, they have around 15 colonies in various villages of Mandi Yazman.

Buddhism in modern Pakistan
Tridev Roy, the Chakma chief, supported Pakistan during the 1971 Bangladesh Liberation War; he then left the Chittagong region and settled in Pakistan. He claimed to represent the Buddhists of Pakistan by founding and chairing the "Pakistan Buddhist Society" from 1996 until his death in 2012. His family stayed behind in Bangladesh.

Lala Rajoo Raam is the representative of the Baori Buddhists community. He is also a councillor for Chak number 75 DB, Union Council number 88. He also twice contested elections for the Punjab assembly.

Taliban destruction of Buddhist relics

The Swat Valley in Pakistan has many Buddhist carvings and stupas, and Jehanabad contains a Seated Buddha statue. Kushan-era Buddhist stupas and statues in Swat valley were demolished by the foreign-funded Taliban and after two attempts by them, the Jehanabad Buddha's face was destroyed by dynamite. Only the Bamiyan Buddhas were larger than the carved giant Buddha statue in Swat near Mangalore. The government did nothing to safeguard the statue after the initial attempt at destroying it, which did not cause permanent damage, but when the second attack took place on the statue, its feet, shoulders and face were demolished. Islamists such as the Taliban and looters destroyed much of Pakistan's Buddhist artifacts left over from the Buddhist Gandhara civilization, especially in Swat Valley. The Taliban deliberately targeted Gandhara Buddhist relics for destruction. The Christian Archbishop of Lahore Lawrence John Saldanha wrote a letter to Pakistan's government denouncing the Taliban activities in Swat Valley including their destruction of Buddha statues and their attacks on Christians, Sikhs, and Hindus. Gandhara Buddhist artifacts were also looted by smugglers. A group of Italians helped repair the Buddha at Jahan Abad, Swat.

Pakistan Buddhist tourism 

In March 2013, a group of around 20 Buddhist monks from South Korea made the journey to the monastery of Takht-i-Bahi, 170 kilometers (106 miles) from Islamabad. The monks defied appeals from Seoul to abandon their trip for safety reasons, and were guarded by Pakistani security forces on their visit to the monastery, built of ochre-colored stone and nestled on a mountainside. From around 1,000 years BCE until the 7th century CE, northern Pakistan and parts of modern Afghanistan formed the Gandhara kingdom, where Greek and Buddhist customs mixed to create what became the Mahayana strand of the religion. The monk Marananta set out from what is now northwest Pakistan to cross China and spread Buddhism in the Korean peninsula during the 4th century. The authorities are even planning package tours for visitors from China, Japan, Singapore and South Korea, including trips to the Buddhist sites at Takht-e-Bahi, Swat, Peshawar and Taxila, near Islamabad.

Historical figures 
Some Buddhist historical figures who hailed from present-day Pakistan include:

Khema from Sialkot, 6th century B.C.E
Bhadda Kapilani from Sialkot, 6th century B.C.E
Anoja from Sialkot, 6th century B.C.E
Kumaralata from Taxila, 3rd century C.E
 Asanga from Peshawar, 4th-century C.E.
Garab Dorje from Oddiyana (Swat), 7th century A.D
 Vasubandhu from Peshawar, 4th to 5th century CE
 Padmasambhava from Swat, 8th century CE
Tridev Roy, Pakistani Buddhist politician and leader

Gallery

See also

History of Buddhism
Gandharan Buddhism
Hindu and Buddhist architectural heritage of Pakistan
History of Pakistan
Mansehra Rock Edicts
Silk Road transmission of Buddhism
Decline of Buddhism in the Indian subcontinent
Index: Buddhism by country

References

External links

 Archaeology in Gandhara region —Buddhist sites

 
Pakistan
History of religion in Pakistan
History of Pakistan
Religion in Pakistan